Teletanks were a series of wireless remotely controlled unmanned tanks produced in the Soviet Union in the 1930s and early 1940s so as to reduce combat risk to soldiers. They saw their first combat use in the Winter War, at the start of World War II. Teletanks were used by the Soviet Red Army in the Winter War against Finland, fielding at least two teletank battalions at the beginning of the  Eastern Front campaign in the Second World War.

Design 

Teletanks were equipped with DT machine guns, flamethrowers, smoke canisters, and sometimes a special 200–700 kg time bomb in an armoured box, dropped by the tank near the enemy's fortifications and used to destroy bunkers up to four levels below ground. Teletanks were also designed to be capable of using chemical weapons, although they were not used in combat. Each teletank, depending on model, was able to recognize sixteen to twenty-four different commands sent via radio on two possible frequencies to avoid interference and jamming. Teletanks were built based on T-18, T-26, T-38, BT-5 and BT-7 light tanks.

Standard tactics were for the TU control tank (with radio transmitter and operator) to stay back as far as practicable while the teletank (TT) approached the enemy. The control tank would provide fire support as well as protection for the radio control operator. If the enemy was successful at seizing the teletank, the control tank crew was instructed to destroy it with its main gun. When not in combat the teletank was driven manually.

In addition to teletanks, there were also remotely controlled telecutters and teleplanes in the Red Army.

See also
 Telerobotics
 Teleoperation
 Goliath tracked mine
 List of Russian inventions

References

External links
 What is teletank? 
 All about teletank 
 Means of communication in battlefield 
 First Soviet tanks 
 Light amphibious tank T-38 
 70 years jubilee of Ulianovsk Higher Engineering School 

Light tanks of the Soviet Union
Interwar tanks of the Soviet Union
World War II tanks of the Soviet Union
Robots of the Soviet Union
Russian inventions
Soviet inventions
Soviet chemical weapons program
Chemical weapon delivery systems
World War II light tanks
Light tanks of the interwar period
Unmanned ground combat vehicles
1930s robots
Tracked robots
Tracked military vehicles
History of the tank
Military vehicles introduced in the 1930s